Obrigheim (South Franconian: Owweringe) is a town in the district of Neckar-Odenwald-Kreis, in Baden-Württemberg, Germany.

It is the location of the Obrigheim Nuclear Power Plant.

History 

The concentration camp Neckarelz was from March 1944 to March 1945 an extension of the concentration camp Natzweiler-Struthof. Thousands of forced workers and KZ-prisoners had to build tunnels in the nearby mountains.

Mayors 
In October 2014 Achim Walter (FDP) was elected the new mayor. He is the successor of Roland Lauer (CDU), he was 24 years in office.

References

Neckar-Odenwald-Kreis
Populated places on the Neckar basin
Populated riverside places in Germany